"My Mistakes Were Made for You" is the third single released by The Last Shadow Puppets. It was released on 20 October 2008 in the United Kingdom on Domino Records, featuring three b-sides: a live version of the album track "Separate and Ever Deadly" plus two covers. The US-only 8-song expanded EP was released in digital format on 21 October and on CD on 4 November 2008. It was the final release of the band's first period of activity.

The song was inspired by Scott Walker's song "The Old Man's Back Again", off his album Scott 4.  The song also appears to glean influences from Noel Harrison's "The Windmills of Your Mind".

Music video
The video for "My Mistakes Were Made for You" was shot at Pinewood studios and directed by Richard Ayoade. The music video shows Turner on a crashed car with Alexa Chung, his then girlfriend. Kane appears later. It won best video award at the NME Awards 2009.

The video was inspired by Federico Fellini's cult film Toby Dammit.

Track listing

Charts

References 

2008 singles
2008 songs
The Last Shadow Puppets songs
Songs written by Alex Turner (musician)
Song recordings produced by James Ford (musician)
Songs written by Miles Kane
Domino Recording Company singles